The Presbyterian University, Ghana (formerly Presbyterian University College, Ghana) is a partially private & public university with multi- campuses and its headquarters located at Abetifi-Kwahu in the Eastern Region of Ghana. It is one of the new universities in Ghana granted accreditation by the Ghana Tertiary Education Commission – GTEC (formerly National Accreditation Board-NAB). It was established by the Presbyterian Church of Ghana (PCG) on 23 November 2003 and inaugurated on 27 March 2004 by the president of Ghana in that republic, John Agyekum Kufuor.

On Tuesday, 30 August 2022, the university was granted a Presidential Charter by President of Ghana Nana Akufo Addo. It has been ranked the best private university in Ghana and third best after the University of Ghana and KNUST by world university ranking website webometrics.

History and background 
Per historical accounts, the Presbyterian Church of Ghana established Ghana's first elementary school in the country in 1843 which resulted in the institutionalization of formal education in the country. In 1848, the church founded a teacher-catechist seminary, the Basel Mission Seminary, later known as the Presbyterian Training College (PTC) at Akropong as the second higher educational institution in West Africa after Fourah Bay College in Sierra Leone. This development led to the establishment of several primary and secondary schools and colleges of education through a strategic partnership with the Ghanaian government; specifically, 1,886 schools made up of 490 kindergartens, 973 primary school, 388 junior secondary schools, 25 senior secondary schools, five vocational institutes and five colleges of education. The church has also been instrumental in providing agricultural and health services for citizens.

The initial plan was to upgrade the Presbyterian Training College at Akropong to a full-fledged university like Fourah Bay College but that did no come into fruition. More than a century and a half later, the Synod of the Presbyterian Church during its 1996 conference voted to establish an actual university culminating in the setting up of an Implementation Committee in 1998. The university sought to augment higher education services to meet to increasing demand for college education. Despite its religious affiliation, the university college welcome students of all backgrounds, ethnicity, religion and geography. The school runs a fee-paying, multi-campus, residential or hostel system in partnership with private enterprise. Its academic programs are in humanities and social sciences, particularly theology, language and mission studies. The school also offers programs in science and technology including health sciences, medicine, dentistry and nursing.

Objectives 
The stated objectives in the institutions statutes are as follows:
 "To provide for and promote University education, learning and research,
 To acquire and disseminate knowledge and information,
 To foster relationships with other institutions of higher learning, persons and bodies.
 To produce disciplined, self-motivated individuals and leaders with moral and intellectual values in the realization of their responsibilities to God, fellow citizens and the state."
Furthermore, the principles underpinning the university's founding include:
 "that in determining the courses and programmes to be taught emphasis shall be placed on a balanced pursuit of the humanities, the basic sciences, the development, application and management of technology, which are of special relevance to the needs and aspirations of Ghanaians in particular, and others in general;
 that higher education in this University shall be available to all Ghanaians and others who are capable of benefiting from it;
 that research shall be undertaken in all courses which are taught in the University but with attention to courses which relate to the social, cultural, economic, scientific, technical and other problems which exists in Ghana or elsewhere in Africa;
 that the fruits of research and knowledge generally shall be spread abroad by the publication of books and papers and by any other suitable means;
 that students shall be taught methods of critical and independent thought, while being made aware that they have a responsibility to use their education for the service of the Church, country and humanity;
 that as far as practicable the students shall be trained to be innovative and entrepreneurial to enhance socio- economic development;
 that the University shall operationalize local, regional and global needs assessment as the basis for practical and multi-disciplinary outreach programmes in the local and regional communities;
 that the University shall inculcate in the student ethical, moral and intellectual values that manifest in courage, discipline, fair play, self motivation and respect for the dignity of an honest life."

Organization
The university has five campuses at Abetifi-Kwahu, Akropong-Akuapem in the Eastern Region, Agogo – Asante Akyem in the Ashanti Region, the city campus at Tema in the Greater Accra Region and Kumasi Santasi Ashanti Region. Each of these campuses has its own set of faculties and other facilities.

OKwahu Campus

Faculty of Science and Technology
 Department of Information and Communication Technology and Mathematics
 BSc. ICT
 BSc. Mathematics with Statistics
 BSc. Mathematics with Accounting
 Department of Computer Engineering
 BSc. Computer Engineering

School of Business
 Department of Business Administration
 BSc. Business Administration (Accounting & Finance)
 BSc. Business Administration (Banking & Finance)
 BSc. Business Administration (General Management)
 BSc. Business Administration (Human Resource Management)
 BSc. Business Administration (Marketing)
 Department of Agribusiness
 BSc. Agricbusiness

Asante Akyem Campus

Faculty of Health and Medical Sciences

 Department of Physician Assistantship
 BSc. Physician Assistantship
 Department of Nursing & Midwifery
 BSc. Nursing 
 BSc. Midwifery

Akuapem campus

Faculty of education
 Department of Social Studies
 BEd. Social Studies

Faculty of Development Studies
 Department of International Development Studies
 BSc. International Development Studies
 Department of Environmental and Natural Resource Management
 BSc. Environmental and Natural Resource Management

Kumasi Campus
Faculty of Law
 Bachelor of Law (LLB)

Tema Campus
 BSc. Business Administration (Accounting & Finance)
 BSc. Business Administration (Banking & Finance)
 BSc. Business Administration (General Management)
 BSc. Business Administration (Human Resource Management)
 BSc. Business Administration (Marketing)

School of Graduate Studies 

 MEd. Educational Studies
 MPhil. Educational Studies
 MA. International Development Studies (IDS)
 MSc. Environmental Health & Sanitation
 MSc. Natural Resources Management
 MSc. Financial Risk Management
 Master of Public Health (MPH)

Affiliations
The university until Tuesday, 30 August 2022 was affiliated to the University of Ghana, University of Cape Coast and Kwame Nkrumah University of Science and Technology

Presidential Charter 
On Tuesday, 30 August 2022, the university, with two others, was granted a Presidential Charter by President Akufo Addo, in a small ceremony in Accra. The charter granted the university gives it a legal authorization to award its own degree or diploma certificates.

See also
 List of universities in Ghana
 University of Ghana

References

External links
 National Accreditation Board
 Presbyterian University College
 Presbyterian University College Foundation on the Presbyterian University College
 Ranking of Ghanaian Universities

Christian universities and colleges in Ghana
Education in Accra
Educational institutions established in 2003
2003 establishments in Ghana